William Stourton, 12th Baron Stourton (died 1685) was the grandson and successor of William Stourton. He was the son of Edward Stourton (1617-January 1644) and Mary Petre (c. 1624–1672), daughter of the 3rd Baron Petre

He married Elizabeth Preston (died April 1688), daughter of Sir John Preston, in 1665. The couple had at least four sons;

Edward (1665–1720), became Baron in 1685.
Thomas (1667–1743), became Baron in 1720.
Capt. Charles Stourton (1669-18 Sept 1739), father of:
Charles Stourton, who became Baron in 1743.
William Stourton, who became Baron in 1754.
John Stourton (1673-3 October 1748)

Notes

References
 Kidd, Charles and Williamson, David (editors). Debrett's Peerage and Baronetage (1995 edition). London: St. Martin's Press, 1995, 

1685 deaths
12
17th-century English nobility
Year of birth unknown